Metoptomatidae is an extinct family of fossil mollusks from the Paleozoic era. These mollusks are either (Gastropoda or Monoplacophora).

Taxonomy 
The taxonomy of the Gastropoda by Bouchet & Rocroi, 2005 categorizes Metoptomatidae within the 
Paleozoic molluscs of uncertain systematic position. This family is unassigned to superfamily. This family has no subfamilies.

Genera 
Genera in the family Metoptomatidae include:
 Metoptoma Philips, 1836, the type genus of the family Metoptomatidae

References 

Prehistoric gastropods